The Giardino Botanico del Museo Civico di Scienze Naturali di Faenza is a botanical garden located on the grounds of the Museo Civico di Scienze Naturali, Via Medaglie d'Oro n. 51, Faenza, Province of Ravenna, Emilia-Romagna, Italy. The garden was established in the 1980s, and currently contains about 170 species of woody plants indigenous to the Romagna region.

See also 
 List of botanical gardens in Italy

References 
 Museo Civico di Scienze Naturali di Faenza (Italian)

Botanical gardens in Italy
Gardens in Emilia-Romagna